The Claret Stakes was a flat horse race in Great Britain open to four-year-olds. It was run on the Ditch-In course at Newmarket over a distance of 2 miles (3,218 metres), and was scheduled to take place each year in early or mid April at the Craven meeting. The Ditch-In course had a six furlong uphill finish and was considered more testing then the Two Middle Miles course, over which the similar Port Stakes was run.

Winners to 1841

References

Flat races in Great Britain
Newmarket Racecourse
Recurring sporting events established in 1808
Discontinued horse races